Eklund is a Swedish surname.

Geographical distribution
As of 2014, 57.3% of all known bearers of the surname Eklund were residents of Sweden (frequency 1:641), 22.2% of the United States (1:60,735), 13.1% of Finland (1:1,564), 1.9% of Norway (1:10,024), 1.7% of Canada (1:79,135) and 1.0% of Denmark (1:20,451).

In Sweden, the frequency of the surname was higher than national average (1:641) in the following counties:
 1. Uppsala County (1:304)
 2. Västmanland County (1:354)
 3. Västerbotten County (1:369)
 4. Gävleborg County (1:415)
 5. Södermanland County (1:457)
 6. Örebro County (1:482)
 7. Gotland County (1:483)
 8. Dalarna County (1:485)
 9. Östergötland County (1:549)
 10. Norrbotten County (1:578)
 11. Stockholm County (1:609)

In Finland, the frequency of the surname was higher than national average (1:1,564) in the following regions:
 1. Åland (1:210)
 2. Ostrobothnia (1:343)
 3. Uusimaa (1:972)
 4. Southwest Finland (1:1,030)

People
Anders Eklund (1957–2010), Swedish boxer
Anders Eklund (murderer) (born 1965), Swedish murderer and rapist
Bengt Eklund (1925–1998), Swedish actor
Brian Eklund (born 1980), American professional ice hockey goalie
Carl R. Eklund (1909–1972), American specialist in ornithology and geographic research in polar regions
Christian Eklund (born 1977), Swedish professional ice hockey player
Dicky Eklund (born 1957), American welterweight boxer
Ella Eklund (1894–1953), Swedish diver
Erik Schultz-Eklund (born 1990), Swedish footballer
Ernst Eklund (actor) (1882–1971), Swedish actor
Ernst Eklund (diver) (born 1894), Swedish diver
Fredrik Eklund (born 1977), New York City real estate broker
Gordon Eklund (born 1945), American science fiction author
Greg Eklund (born 1970), drummer for the American rock band Everclear
Gunnar Eklund (1920–2010), Swedish Army lieutenant general
Hans Eklund (born 1969), Swedish football manager and former football player
Jakob Eklund (born 1962), Swedish actor
Klas Eklund (born 1952), Swedish economist and writer
Kristin Eklund (born 1979), Swedish artist who uses the stage name Naimi
Matthias Eklund (born 1976), Swedish football striker
Michael Eklund, Canadian actor
Mikael Eklund (born 1981), Swedish footballer (defender)
Niklas Eklund (born 1969), Swedish trumpeter
Oscar Eklund (born 1988), Swedish ice hockey player
Pelle Eklund (born 1963), Swedish retired professional ice hockey center
Per Eklund, (born 1946), Swedish Rally and Rallycross driver
Per Eklund (fighter), Swedish mixed martial arts fighter
Per Eklund (ice hockey) (born 1970), retired Swedish ice hockey player
Per Eklund (born 1945), former EU Ambassador to Georgia 2006–2010
Ray Eklund, American head coach of the University of Kentucky's basketball team
Sigge Eklund (born 1974), Swedish novelist, blogger and web designer
Sigvard Eklund (1911–2000), director of the International Atomic Energy Agency security council
Torolf Eklund (1912–2000), Finnish aircraft designer
William Eklund (born 2002), Swedish professional ice hockey player

See also
Eklund Islands, group of islands near the southwest end of George VI Sound towards the south of the Antarctic Peninsula
Eklund TE-1, Finnish-built single seat flying boat of the late 1940s

References

Swedish-language surnames